Roger Vailland (16 October 1907 – 12 May 1965) was a French novelist, essayist, and screenwriter.

Biography
Vailland was born in Acy-en-Multien, Oise.  His novels include the prize winning Drôle de jeu (1945), Les mauvais coups (1948), Un jeune homme seul (1951), 325 000 francs (1955), and La loi (1957), winner of the Prix Goncourt. His screenplays include Les liaisons dangereuses (with Claude Brûlé and Roger Vadim, 1959) and Le vice et la vertu (with Vadim, 1962). He died, aged 57, in Millionaires, Ain.

Vailland took part in the French Resistance during Nazi occupation. Drôle de jeu (Playing with Fire) is considered one of the finest novels about the anti-fascist Resistance. Vailland joined the French Communist Party but resigned after the Soviet suppression of the Hungarian Revolution of 1956. He remained an independent leftist for the rest of his life.

Bibliography

Novels

 Drôle de jeu, Prix Interallié, Éditions Corrêa, Paris, 1945
 Les Mauvais coups, Éditions Sagittaire, 1948
 Bon pied, bon œil, Éditions Corrêa, Paris, 1950
 Un Jeune homme seul, Éditions Corrêa, Paris, 1951
 Beau masque, Éditions Gallimard, Paris, 1954
 325 000 francs, Éditions Corrêa, Paris, 1955
 La Loi, Prix Goncourt 1957. English: The Law
 La Fête, Éditions Gallimard, Paris, 1960
 La Truite, Éditions Gallimard, Paris, 1964
 La Visirova, Messidor, Paris, 1986
 Cortès, le conquérant de l'Eldorado, Messidor, Paris, 1992

Travel
 Boroboudour, Éditions Gallimard, Paris
 Boroboudour, voyage à Bali, Java et autres îles, Éditions du Sonneur, Paris

Journals
 Chronique d’Hiroshima à Goldfinger : 1945-1965, Éditions sociales, Paris, 1984
 Chronique des années folles à la Libération, Éditions sociales, Paris, 1984.
 Écrits intimes, Éditions Gallimard, Paris, 1982.

Theatre
 Héloïse et Abélard, Editions Corréa, 1947
 Le Colonel Foster plaidera coupable, pièce en cinq actes, les Éditeurs réunis, Paris, 1952. 
 Monsieur Jean, Éditions Gallimard, Paris, 1959

Essays
 Laclos, Éditions du Seuil, Paris, 1953
 Éloge du Cardinal de Bernis, Éditions Grasset, Paris, 1956. 
 Expérience du drame, Éditions du Rocher, Monaco, 2002
 Un homme du peuple sous la Révolution, Éditions Gallimard, Paris, 1979
 Le regard froid : réflexions, esquisses, libelles, 1945-1962, Éditions Grasset, Paris, 1998
 N’aimer que ce qui n’a pas de prix, Éditions du Rocher, Monaco, 1995
 Les pages immortelles de Suétone, Éditions du Rocher, Monaco, 2002
 Le Saint-Empire, Éditions de la différence, Paris, 1978
  Le Surréalisme contre la révolution, Éditions Complexe, Bruxelles, 1988

References

External links 
 Roger Vailland

1907 births
1965 deaths
People from Oise
French male screenwriters
French screenwriters
French communists
French Resistance members
Prix Goncourt winners
Lycée Louis-le-Grand alumni
Prix Interallié winners
20th-century French novelists
French male essayists
French male novelists
20th-century French essayists
20th-century French male writers
Anti-Stalinist left
20th-century French screenwriters